Elias Soares de Oliveira (born 20 February 1931) is a Brazilian footballer. He played in five matches for the Brazil national football team in 1959. He was also part of Brazil's squad for the 1959 South American Championship that took place in Ecuador.

References

External links
 

1931 births
Living people
Brazilian footballers
Brazil international footballers
Sportspeople from Recife
Association football forwards
Esporte Clube Bahia players
Fluminense FC players
Clube Náutico Capibaribe players
Associação Portuguesa de Desportos players
Jabaquara Atlético Clube players